The Pirates of Manhattan is a book on American finance written by author Barry Dyke. It presents arguments that mutual funds and the stock market are not looking out for the consumer and takes the position that permanent life insurance is the best investment one can make, citing examples of people and companies who have used life insurance to their benefit and profit.

Finance books
2007 non-fiction books